Darien Butler (born March 1, 2000) is an American football outside linebacker for the Las Vegas Raiders of the National Football League (NFL). He played college football at Arizona State.

Early life and high school
Butler grew up in Compton, California and attended Narbonne High School.

College career
Butler was a member of the Arizona State Sun Devils for four seasons. He was named a starter for ASU entering his freshman season. Butler finished his freshman season with 70 tackles and eight tackles for loss. He led the Sun Devils with 88 tackles as a sophomore. Butler started all four of Arizona State's games during the team's COVID-19-shortened 2020 season. He made 68 tackles during his senior season.

Professional career

Butler signed with the Las Vegas Raiders as an undrafted free agent on May 12, 2022. He made the Raiders' initial 53-man roster out of training camp.

References

External links
Arizona State Sun Devils bio
Las Vegas Raiders bio

Living people
Players of American football from California
American football linebackers
Arizona State Sun Devils football players
Las Vegas Raiders players
2000 births